Lickley is a surname. Notable people with the surname include:

Laurie Lickley, American politician and rancher
Martin Lickley (born 1957), English cricketer
Robert Lickley (1912–1998), Scottish aerospace engineer

See also
Hickley